Black music is a sound created, produced, or inspired by black people, people of African descent, including African music traditions and African popular music as well as the music genres of the African diaspora, including Caribbean music, Latin music, Brazilian music and African-American music. These genres include  spiritual, gospel, rumba, blues, bomba, rock and roll, rock, jazz, salsa, R&B, samba, calypso, soca, soul, disco, kwaito, cumbia, funk, ska, reggae, dub reggae, house, Detroit techno, amapiano, hip hop, pop, gqom, afrobeat, and others.

Background
Many genres of music originate from communities that have visible roots in Africa. In North America, it was a way that the early slaves could express themselves and communicate when they were being forcibly relocated and when there were restrictions on what cultural activities they could pursue. The sorrows of song were the only freedom slaves had working on cotton fields, and overall through labor tactics. This burden of slavery became a gateway for other genres of music like the blues for example.  Black music does not just encompass sounds of the U.S. black experience but also a global black experience that stretches from Africa to Americas.

The term for many coming from places of "black" origin can be perceived in a derogatory manner by cultures who see the term as a blurring of lines which ignores the true roots of certain peoples and their specific traditions. To refer to musical genres with strong African-American influence, such as hip hop music, is very limited in scope and is not adopted by academic institutions as a true category of music. The individual aspects and collectively of black music is surrounded by the culture in itself as well as experience. Black music is centered around a story and origin. Many artist start song with the things they experience first hand. Musical blackness was a way of communicating and a way to express themselves especially during hard times such as slavery. Their songs were used to give guidance to one another and tell stories. The varieties of sounds and expressions used in the music helped stress their emotions. 

Black music started to reflect urban environments through amplified sounds, social concerns, and cultural pride expressed through music. It combined blues, jazz, boogie-woogie and gospel taking the form of fast paced dance music with highly energized guitar work appealing to young audiences across racial divides. Also may contain a racial "slang" known and spoken between the african american race.

Genres

 Key Figures
 Bob Marley
 Louis Armstrong
 Jimi Hendrix
 Ella Fitzgerald
 Ray Charles
 Michael Jackson
 Whitney Houston
 Aretha Franklin
 Luthor Vandross
 Will Smith
 LL Cool J
 Notorious BIG
 2Pac
 Future
 Lauryn Hill
 Stevie Wonder
 Prince

 African-American music
Bebop
 Boogie-woogie
 Blues
 Country music
 Detroit techno
 Deep house
 Disco
 Doo-wop
 Free jazz
 Funk
 Go-go
 Gospel music
 Jazz
 Jive
 Jump blues
 New jack swing
 Ragtime
 Hip hop
 House music
 Rhythm and blues
 Rock and roll
 Soul jazz
 Soul
 Spiritual
 Swing jazz
 Techno
 Zydeco
 pop
 Afro-Caribbean music
Dancehall
 Dub
 Ragga
 Reggae
Rocksteady
 Ska
Calypso
 Mento
Soca

 United Kingdom
Acid jazz
Afroswing
Brit funk
British contemporary R&B
British hip hop
British jazz
British reggae
British soul
Drum and bass
UK drill
Dubstep
Jungle
Grime
Rare groove
Ska
Two-tone
UK garage
UK funky

 Music of Africa
African popular music
Music of West Africa
Sub-Saharan African music traditions
Music of Ethiopia
Afrobeat
Gqom
AmaPiano
Kwaito
Maskandi
Isicathamiya
Afrobeats
Coupé-Décalé
Jùjú
Soukous

Cuba
Bakosó
Son
Rumba
Yuka

Haiti
Compas

French West Indies
Zouk

Brazilian music
Choro
Samba
Samba reggae
Samba rock

Music of the Dominican Republic
Bachata
Merengue

Music of Ecuador
Bambuco
Bomba

Uruguay
Candombe

Puerto Rico
Plena
Bomba
Reggaeton

Peru
Festejo
Cueca
Landó

See also
List of calypsos with sociopolitical influences
 Music of Black Origin Awards
 Music of the African diaspora

References

Further reading
 Spencer, Jon Michael. Black hymnody: a hymnological history of the African-American church (1992)

Music by ethnicity
Music of the African diaspora
African-American music
Traditional music
Popular music